Bellow's Regiment of Militia also known as the 16th New Hampshire Militia Regiment was called up at Walpole, New Hampshire, on September 21, 1777, as reinforcements for the Continental Army during the Saratoga Campaign. The regiment marched quickly to join the gathering forces of Gen. Horatio Gates as he faced British Gen. John Burgoyne in northern New York. The regiment served in Gen. William Whipple's brigade of New Hampshire militia. With the surrender of Burgoyne's Army on October 17 the regiment was disbanded on October 27, 1777.

Sources
State Builders: An Illustrated Historical and Biographical Record of the State of New Hampshire. State Builders Publishing Manchester, NH 1903

External links
Bibliography of the Continental Army in New Hampshire compiled by the United States Army Center of Military History

Military units and formations established in 1777
New Hampshire militia units in the American Revolution